Virgin CrossCountry was a train operating company in the United Kingdom operating the InterCity CrossCountry passenger franchise from January 1997 until November 2007. Virgin CrossCountry operated some of the longest direct rail services in the United Kingdom but most avoided Greater London after 2003. All services called or terminated at Birmingham New Street.

The company traded under the Virgin Trains brand, along with the InterCity West Coast franchise, however the two franchises were operated by separate legal entities.

History

Virgin Rail Group was awarded the InterCity CrossCountry franchise in November 1996, with operations commencing on 5 January 1997. Services were operated by a wholly owned subsidiary, CrossCountry Trains Limited.

In October 1998, Virgin Group sold 49% of the shares in Virgin Rail Group to Stagecoach.

In the wake of the collapse of Railtrack and the inability of Network Rail to deliver on the 140 mph West Coast Main Line upgrade, both the Virgin CrossCountry and Virgin West Coast franchises were suspended in favour of management contracts in July 2002.

In September 2006 the Department for Transport announced the shortlist for the New CrossCountry franchise with Virgin Rail Group included. On 10 July 2007 the Department for Transport awarded the new CrossCountry franchise to Arriva with the services operated by Virgin CrossCountry transferring to CrossCountry on 11 November 2007.

Services
In May 1998 Virgin introduced new services from Portsmouth Harbour to Liverpool Lime Street and Blackpool North.  The Summer Saturday service to Ramsgate ran for the last time in September 1999. The Summer Saturday services to Weymouth ran for the last time in September 2002.

Operation Princess
In September 2002 Virgin Trains launched Operation Princess.  This involved introducing a new clockface timetable with shorter trains running more frequently.  However the new fleet suffered from a number of technical faults which coupled with infrastructure and capacity issues led to many problems. Between September 2002 and January 2003 punctuality fell to 54.1%, it was therefore agreed with the Strategic Rail Authority that certain services would be cut to improve reliability and robustness on the core network.

When Operation Princess was launched in September 2002, Virgin CrossCountry served these destinations:

Project Omega

Project Omega was a project which would have seen a series of improvements following the West Coast modernisation. These services would have been run by the Class 220. The project also involved extending Virgin's West Coast and CrossCountry franchises by 5 years (both originally planned to end in 2012, so would have been 2017) as well as adding a fifth car to 38 Voyagers.

By the time Virgin Trains lost the CrossCountry franchise bid to Arriva in 2007 the network consisted of only the following routes:

Rolling stock
Virgin CrossCountry inherited a fleet of Class 47 and Class 86 locomotives, Mark 2 Carriages, High Speed Trains and Class 158 Express Sprinter diesel multiple units from British Rail. Class 47s on hire from English Welsh & Scottish and Fragonset were also fairly common.

A franchise commitment was the replacement of these trains with new stock. In December 1998 Virgin signed a deal to lease 78 Voyager diesel–electric multiple units built by Bombardier Transportation, consisting of 34 four-carriage Class 220 Voyagers and 40 five-carriage and four four-carriage Class 221 Super Voyagers. The Super Voyagers were built with tilting mechanisms to enable higher speeds on curved tracks, including on the West Coast Main Line and between Oxford and Banbury. The four-carriage Super Voyagers were intended for use by Virgin West Coast on services from London Euston to Holyhead, although they ended up being pooled with the other Voyagers. When Virgin West Coast started using Super Voyagers on Holyhead services in September 2004, the five-carriage units were used.

The first Class 220 Voyager arrived from Belgium in January 2001 and entered service on 21 May 2001. The last Class 47s, Class 86s and Mark 2 carriages were withdrawn in August 2002, while the Express Sprinters were transferred to Wessex Trains and First TransPennine Express.

After experiencing rapid growth Virgin CrossCountry decided to retain some High Speed Train sets. In December 2001 it announced plans to refurbish eight HSTs as Virgin Challengers for use on proposed services from London Paddington to Manchester Piccadilly via Cheltenham, with the option to refurbish more. In the wake of the collapse of Operation Princess, the project was cancelled with the remaining HSTs withdrawn in September 2003 on the instruction of the Strategic Rail Authority.

To provide extra stock for services on summer Saturday services to Paignton and Newquay, Virgin CrossCountry hired HSTs from Virgin West Coast, Midland Mainline and Great North Eastern Railway (GNER), and Mark 3B loco-hauled carriages from Virgin West Coast. In 2004 Virgin hired Class 67 locomotives from EWS and Mark 2 carriages from Riviera Trains to operate summer Saturday services to Paignton.

A standby set of Mark 2 carriages was leased from Riviera Trains from September 2004. This set was usually used with an EWS Class 90 locomotive between Birmingham New Street and Manchester Piccadilly, although it did run to Newcastle with a Class 57/3 in January 2007.

HSTs were hired from Midland Mainline and GNER on a number of occasions to operate services from Edinburgh Waverley to Plymouth when Voyagers were unavailable.

Original fleet

Final fleet

Planned fleet (never built)

See also
Passenger rail franchising in Great Britain
Cross Country Route

References

External links

Defunct train operating companies
Railway companies established in 1997
Railway companies disestablished in 2007
Stagecoach Group
Virgin Trains
British companies established in 1997
British companies disestablished in 2007